Costică Donose (born 22 December 1952) is a Romanian former footballer who played as a central midfielder. After he ended his playing career, he worked as a manager in the Romanian lower leagues. In 2003 Donose received the Honorary Citizen of Craiova title.

Honours
Chimia Râmnicu Vâlcea
Divizia B: 1973–74
Cupa României: 1972–73
Universitatea Craiova
Divizia A: 1979–80, 1980–81
Cupa României: 1976–77, 1977–78, 1980–81, 1982–83

References

External links
Costică Donose at Labtof.ro

1952 births
Living people
Romanian footballers
Association football midfielders
Liga I players
Liga II players
Liga III players
CS Universitatea Craiova players
Chimia Râmnicu Vâlcea players
FC Olt Scornicești players
Romanian football managers
People from Tecuci